Hanza may refer to:

 Hanza, Kerman, Anduhjerd Rural District, Shahdad District, Kerman County, Kerman Province, Iran
 Hanza, Rabor, Hanza Rural District, Hanza District, Rabor County, Kerman Province, Iran
 Hanza, Yazd, Miankuh Rural District, Central District of Mehriz County, Yazd Province, Iran
 Hanza Tower, skyscraper in Szczecin, Poland
 Boscia senegalensis, a plant

See also
 Hunza (disambiguation)